Crenicara is a small genus of cichlid fishes native to creeks and rivers in the Amazon and Essequibo basins in South America. These cichlids have several dark spots on the sides of their bodies, and do not surpass  in length.

In the past, the members of the genus Dicrossus were sometimes included in Crenicara. Members of both genera are sometimes known as checkerboard or chessboard cichlids.

Species
The two recognized species in this genus are:
 Crenicara latruncularium S. O. Kullander & Staeck, 1990
 Crenicara punctulatum (Günther, 1863) (checkerboard cichlid)

 Names brought to synonymy
 Crenicara altispinosa Haseman, 1911, a synonym for Mikrogeophagus altispinosus
 Crenicara elegans Steindachner, 1875, a synonym for Crenicara punctulatum, the Checkerboard cichlid
 Crenicara filamentosa Ladiges, 1958, a synonym for Dicrossus filamentosus, the Chessboard cichlid
 Crenicara maculata (Steindachner, 1875) and Crenicara praetoriusi Weise, 1935, synonyms for Dicrossus maculatus

References 

Geophagini
Fish of South America
Cichlid genera
Taxa named by Franz Steindachner